Kyle Juliano is a Filipino pop singer that first published his covers on Facebook. He released his first singles "Malapit Pa Rin" (a rendition of the song by Piolo Pascual) and "Sundo", but gained success with his single "Crashing".

References 

Living people
1997 births
People from Dumaguete
Filipino male pop singers
Universal Records (Philippines) artists
21st-century Filipino male singers